Incubation: Time Is Running Out (also known as Incubation: Battle Isle Phase Four) is a turn-based tactics computer game from Blue Byte released in 1997. In the game, the player controls a squad of soldiers in a campaign against an alien threat.

Gameplay
The single-player campaign includes around 30 missions set in futuristic interiors full of aliens, as a squad of space marines battles to save the civilians and themselves. The game has some head-to-head and co-op multiplayer support via LAN and software such as Kali. There are three difficulty levels which influence parameters like monster respawn and damage rates.

Outside of missions, the main decision is which weapons and equipment to purchase to outfit the squad. A variety of weapons are available. Some low-level guns feature bayonets for mêlée combat, which form a substantial element of the game. Equipment like jetpacks, scanners, improved armor, stimulants and medical kits becomes available as the space marines accumulate experience points.

Plot
Incubation is part of the Battle Isle series, though it is only loosely related to the other installments. The plot is told outside of combat, through cutscenes, and the main character's voiced weary, pessimistic monologues during mission briefings.

Cpl. Braddock is a space marine going stir crazy on a space station under Capt. Rachel Rutherford. He's at risk of hearing a fellow corporal's war story for the sixth time when the call comes to deploy to the planet below. Equipment failure has exposed the colonial city of Scay-Hallwa to the planet's environment and introduced a virus among the indigenous inhabitants, Scay'Ger, who are now turning into bloodthirsty monsters. 

Braddock and his squad take part in a holding action to buy time for the city to be isolated again, and rescue a noted virologist. Gen. Urelis, the planetside commander, promotes Braddock to sergeant and sets to defending the city while the virologist cures the virus. Sadly, as Rutherford briefs her troops, this is the exact opposite of what the virologist actually tried to tell Urelis. The virus (herpes simplex) is common and endemic to humans, and has no cure. Urelis shows a flair for dramatic and counterproductive maneuvers, unveils a counterattack strategy entirely too late, authorizes lethal force against fleeing civilians to maintain order, and to Braddock's grim satisfaction, is overrun and killed. As the city falls the marines give up even the pretense of obeying Urelis and escort civilian evacuees to an airlift to safety, but Braddock and his squad are caught in a rearguard action, cut off, and stranded. Rutherford parachutes down to assist, and together they fight their way to a pick-up point. As the marines return to the station, an exhausted Braddock asks his chatty colleague for a story, rejects hearing any of the new ones, and tells him to take his time.

Release
Incubation was released on October 17, 1997 as one of the first strategy titles to use fully 3D graphics, and supported hardware acceleration on the 3dfx Voodoo. Blue Byte later published an expansion pack, The Wilderness Missions, which added new missions with more resourceful enemies, as well as a map editor.

Reception
In the United States, the game sold only 4,805 copies during 1997. Critical reception of Incubation was mostly positive. PC Gamer awarded it the title of the Best Turn-Based Strategy Game of 1997. Others felt the game made some steps in the right direction but lacked the depth and challenge needed for a great strategy game. Writing for GameSpot, Greg Kasavin noted that "most weapons at your disposal carry limited ammunition and can overheat rather quickly, forcing you to fire only when you must". Niko Nirvi of Pelit, who initially considered Incubation a botched squad-based strategy game, came to think of it as a sort of puzzle game and was very taken with it. GamePro praised the originality, storyline, interface, and many cerebral challenges. They concluded, "Best of all, the game is both challenging and fun, proving that real-time strategy isn't always best. Incubation definitely ranks as a winner."

References

External links
Incubation at Blue Byte Game Channel

Incubation: Time is Running Out at GameSpot

1997 video games
Blue Byte games
Multiplayer hotseat games
Science fiction video games
Tactical role-playing video games
Turn-based tactics video games
Video games about extraterrestrial life
Video games developed in Germany
Windows games
Windows-only games
Multiplayer and single-player video games